Shatili (Šat’ili ) is a historic highland village in Georgia, near the border with Chechnya. It is located on the northern slope of the Greater Caucasus mountains, in the historical Georgian province of Upper Khevsureti, which is now part of the modern-day region (mkhare) of Mtskheta-Mtianeti. As of 2014 census, population of the village was 22.

Geography

Located in the deep Arghuni gorge at approximate 1,400 meters, the village is actually a unique complex of medieval-to-early modern fortresses and fortified dwellings of stone and mortar which functioned both as a residential area and a fortress guarding the northeastern outskirts of the country. The fortress consists of the terraced structures dominated by flat-roofed dwellings and some 60 towers which cluster together to create a single chain of fortifications.

Unique architectural methods and thought are realised in Shatili: selection of location, development of the land with complicated relief, rational land tenure, multifunctionalism, vertical zoning of construction, optimal orientation.

Both single monuments and the overall urban structure with their characteristic components (towers, residential complexes, sowing, chapels) are of special importance.

History and current status
Shatili was once part of the Kingdom of Kakheti.

The population of Shatili, along with that of most of the Khevsureti, was resettled under the pressure from the Soviet authorities to the plains in the early 1950s. In the 1960s, the exotic landscape of the empty village was used as a setting for a series of Georgian films about the past life of the highlanders.  

Shatili is still inhabited by a dozen or so families, but is inaccessible by road during wintertime. The village is a favourite destination for tourists and mountain trekkers.

Statements of authenticity and/or integrity 
The authenticity of Shatili is completely preserved in architectural forms, materials, location and other necessary attributes. The physical condition of buildings can be characterised as good.

Comparison with other similar properties 
At national level, Shatili might be compared with Upper Svaneti World Heritage site. Both properties, due to their isolation, make it unique in the region. The only direct comparisons at wider extent that might be made would be with isolated communities in the Himalayan massif, but these stem from a completely different cultural tradition.

See also
Mtskheta-Mtianeti
Mutso
Dargavs

Readings 
Shorena Kurtsikidze & Vakhtang Chikovani, Ethnography and Folklore of the Georgia-Chechnya Border: Images, Customs, Myths & Folk Tales of the Peripheries, Munich: Lincom Europa, 2008.

References

Villages in Mtskheta-Mtianeti
World Heritage Tentative List
Castles and forts in Georgia (country)
Buildings and structures in Mtskheta-Mtianeti
Tourist attractions in Mtskheta-Mtianeti
Tiflis Governorate
Immovable Cultural Monuments of National Significance of Georgia